"I Feel You" is the first single from Sam Roberts' fourth studio album, Collider. It is the first single released under the moniker "Sam Roberts Band" instead of "Sam Roberts". The song was officially released to Canadian radio on February 28, with an iTunes Canada release of March 8.

Music video
The music video for "I Feel You" was directed by Dave Pawsey and debuted on May 25, 2011. The video features a light show while the band performs.

Charts

References

External links

2011 singles
Sam Roberts songs
Songs written by Sam Roberts
2011 songs